Heidi Wunderli-Allenspach (born 1 January 1947) is a Swiss biologist and was the first female director of ETH Zürich.

Life and work 
Wunderli-Allenspach was born in 1947 in Niederuzwil in the Canton of St. Gallen in Switzerland. She graduated with the master's degree in Biology at ETH Zurich in 1970, and then she worked as a research assistant at the Institute for Brain Research at the University of Zurich. Thenafter she postgraduatedin Experimental Medicine and Biology at the University of Zurich. Wunderli subsequently did her Ph.D. thesis at the Department of Microbiology at the Biozentrum in Basel, and as research associate at the Department of Surgery, Duke University Medical Center, Durham NC, from 1976 to 1978 in the USA. Between 1978 and 1981 she worked as a postdoctoral fellow at the Swiss Institute for Experimental Cancer Research in Lausanne, and from 1981 to 1984 at the Institute for Immunology and Virology of the University of Zurich.

ETH Zurich 
In 1985 Wunderli joined the Department of Pharmacy at the ETH Zurich. Between 1986 and 1992 she was an assistant professor and from 1992 to 1995 an associate professor in biopharmacy. As a professor, Wunderli-Allenspach assumed various charges in the university management. Among others she was the head of the Department of Pharmacy and later of the Department of Chemistry and Applied Biosciences. Education issues were always at her heart; during that time the curriculum was redesigned and the Bachelor/Master system was introduced.

From 1 September 2007 to 31 July 2012, Wunderli-Allenspach was the rector of ETH Zurich and deputy of the ETH's president. She was responsible for all aspects of education from the BSc/MSc level to Ph.D. and continuing education. As a representative of ETH she was a member of the foundation for student housing, for childcare, and of various institutions for the promotion of natural sciences in education, among them the Swiss Science Center Technorama in Winterthur and the NaTech educational program. Furthermore, she was a member of the board of the Zurich University Institute for Education and Didactics.

Research 
Wunderli-Allenspach's research was focused on physicochemical and cell biological aspects of drug absorption, distribution and elimination in the body. Her work was relevant in vitro models for the blood-brain-barrier as well as for epithelial barriers that were established in order to study the transport of drugs through and the interaction of drugs and excipients with membranes and cells under standardized conditions.

Awards 
 1998–2007: Swiss Maturitätskommission and Deputy for the Curriculum of Pharmaceutical Sciences.
 Ecole Polytechnique de Paris, member of the supervisory board.
 Co-director of the "Society in Science: The Branco Weiss Fellowship".
 Chairwoman of the supervisory board of the Technical University of Darmstadt.
 Member of the SATW platform for education.

Publications 
 Peter Langguthm Gert Fricker, Heidi Wunderli-Allenspach: Biopharmazie. Wiley-VCH 2004, .
 Bernard Testa, Stefanie D. Krämer, Heidi Wunderli-Allenspach, Gerd Folkers: Pharmacokinetic Profiling in Drug Research Hardcover, Wiley-VCH 2006, .

References

External links 
 Heidi Wunderli-Allenspach profile at the website of ETH Zurich

1947 births
Living people
20th-century biologists
20th-century Swiss educators
20th-century Swiss scientists
20th-century women educators
20th-century women scientists
21st-century biologists
21st-century Swiss educators
21st-century Swiss scientists
21st-century women educators
21st-century women scientists
ETH Zurich alumni
Academic staff of ETH Zurich
People from the canton of St. Gallen
Scientists from Zürich
Swiss academic administrators
Swiss biologists
Swiss educational theorists
Swiss educators
Swiss women academics
Swiss women educators
Swiss women scientists
University of Zurich alumni
Uzwil
Women academic administrators
Women biologists
Women educational theorists